Münstermaifeld is a town in the district Mayen-Koblenz, in Rhineland-Palatinate, Germany. It is part of the Verbandsgemeinde ("collective municipality") of Maifeld. It is situated south-east of Mayen, a few kilometres from the Moselle river and Eltz Castle. The first (B.C.) residents of the region were Celts. The old church is based on a Roman castle-tower. After the Romans, the Franks (Charlemagne) arrived in the 9th century. In the Middle Ages (1277) Münstermaifeld received town privileges and was governed by the bishop of Trier. It is one of the oldest towns in Rhineland-Palatinate and, with its 3,400 citizens, one of the smallest.

Mayors

 up to 2009: Maximilian Mumm
 2009–2014: Robert Müller
 since 2014: Claudia Schneider (CDU)

Born in Münstermaifeld

 Julia Drusilla (16-38), sister of the Emperor Caligula
 Jakob von Eltz-Rübenach (1510–1581) Archbishop-Elector of Trier from 1567 to 1581
 Franz Josef Ignaz Canaris (1791-1828), great-grandfather of Wilhelm Canaris
 Anton Josef Dräger (1794-1833), painter
 Heinrich Klee (1800-1840), Catholic theologian
 Johann Martin Josef Canaris (1817-1894), grandfather of Wilhelm Canaris
 Joseph Wolf (1820-1899), animal painter
 Thomas Anders (born 1963), pop singer and music producer

References

External links
Münstermaifeld website

Mayen-Koblenz